Food Quality and Preference is a peer-reviewed scientific journal in the field of sensory and consumer science, published by Elsevier.

Its scope covers consumer and market research, sensory science, sensometrics and sensory evaluation, nutrition and food choice, as well as food research, product development and sensory quality assurance. It is the official journal of The Sensometric Society and The European Sensory Science Society. The journal also publishes special issues associated with topical sensory conference worldwide, such as the Pangborn Sensory Science Symposium, Eurosense, and Sensometrics.

Abstracting and indexing
The journal is abstracted and indexed in:

According to the Journal Citation Reports, the journal has a 2018 impact factor of 3.684.

See also 
 Consumer science
 Food science
 European Sensory Network
 Pangborn Sensory Science Symposium
 Sensory science

References

External links 
 

Elsevier academic journals
Food science journals
English-language journals
Publications established in 1988